The Tome fraîche or Tomme fraîche is a hard pressed curd, slightly fermented and unsalted based on cow's milk, traditionally produced in the region of Aubrac and Cantal in Haute-Auvergne (Massif central).

History
Tome comes from the occitan word toma designating a fresh cheese. The French orthography used at the end of the 19th century to designate the fresh volume was tome and not tomme.

In cooking
Typically, cooked in a fondue form. Traditionally used in aligot, truffade and patranque. Its milky taste, its slight acidity and its melting properties have extended its use to the making of gratins, vegetable pies, pizzas, etc...

Notes

See also
Aligot
Auvergne
Patranque
Truffade

French cuisine
Cheese dishes
Auvergne
Auvergne-Rhône-Alpes
Massif Central